Feather Man (2007) is a novel by Australian author Rhyll McMaster. It won the inaugural Barbara Jefferis Award for Best Novel in 2008.

Plot summary

This is a coming-of-age novel that follows the story of Sooky from a Brisbane suburb in the 1950s until her adulthood in London in the 1970s.

Reviews

Kerryn Goldsworthy in The Australian stated: "This novel is essentially a Bildungsroman, in which a young person grows up and learns about the ways of the world, but here it's enlivened by a genuine mystery, a slender but powerful narrative thread working away deep in the background of the story." She concluded: "Feather Man is not a pleasant or reassuring book, but it's written with great confidence and lyrical intensity, and most Australian readers will recognise in its pages something of their own time and place."

Awards and nominations

 2007 shortlisted Victorian Premier's Literary Awards – The Vance Palmer Prize for Fiction
 2008 winner Barbara Jefferis Award
 2008 winner New South Wales Premier's Literary Awards – UTS Award for New Writing

References

2007 Australian novels
Australian bildungsromans